Hayaseno Dam is a rockfill dam located in Aomori Prefecture in Japan. The dam is used for irrigation. The catchment area of the dam is 22.8 km2. The dam impounds about 75  ha of land when full and can store 13500 thousand cubic meters of water. The construction of the dam was started on 1968 and completed in 1985.

References

Dams in Aomori Prefecture
1985 establishments in Japan